The Galley Slave is a 1915 American silent drama film directed by J. Gordon Edwards and starring Theda Bara. Based on the play of the same name by Bartley Campbell, the film's scenario was written by Clara S. Beranger. The Galley Slave is now considered lost.

Cast
 Theda Bara as Francesca Brabaut
 Stuart Holmes as Antoine Brabaut
 Claire Whitney as Cecil Blaine
 Lillian Lawrence as Mrs. Blaine
 Jane Lee as Dolores
 Hardee Kirkland as Baron La Bois

See also
List of lost films
1937 Fox vault fire

References

External links

1915 films
1915 drama films
1915 lost films
Fox Film films
Silent American drama films
American silent feature films
American black-and-white films
American films based on plays
Films directed by J. Gordon Edwards
Lost American films
Lost drama films
1910s American films
1910s English-language films
English-language drama films